The Roman Catholic Archdiocese of Palembang is an archdiocese located in the city of Palembang in South Sumatra in Indonesia.

History
 December 27, 1923: Established as Apostolic Prefecture of Benkoelen from the Apostolic Prefecture of Sumatra
 June 13, 1939: Promoted as Apostolic Vicariate of Palembang
 January 3, 1961: Promoted as Diocese of Palembang
 July 1, 2003: Promoted as Metropolitan Archdiocese of Palembang

Leadership
 Archbishops of Palembang (Roman rite)
 Archbishop Yohanes Harun Yuwono (July 3, 2021 – ...)
 Archbishop Aloysius Sudarso, S.C.I. (July 1, 2003 – July 3, 2021)
 Bishops of Palembang (Roman Rite) 
 Bishop Aloysius Sudarso, S.C.I. (later Archbishop) (May 20, 1997 – July 1, 2003)
 Bishop Joseph Hubertus Soudant, S.C.I. (April 5, 1963 – May 20, 1997)
 Bishop Henri Martin Mekkelholt, S.C.I. (April 5, 1963 – December 26, 1969)
 Vicars Apostolic of Palembang (Roman Rite) 
 Bishop Henri Martin Mekkelholt, S.C.I. (June 13, 1939 – January 3, 1961)
 Prefects Apostolic of Benkoelen (Roman Rite) 
 Fr. Henri Martin Mekkelholt, S.C.I. (later Bishop) (January 19, 1934 – June 13, 1939)
 Fr. Harrie van Oort, S.C.I. (January 19, 1927 – 1934)
 Fr. Enrico Smeets, S.C.I. (May 28, 1924 – 1926)

Suffragan dioceses
 Pangkal-Pinang
 Tanjungkarang

References

Sources
 Official website
 GCatholic.org
 Catholic Hierarchy

Palembang
Roman Catholic dioceses in Indonesia
Christian organizations established in 1923
South Sumatra
Roman Catholic dioceses and prelatures established in the 20th century